Andronikos Doukas, Latinized as Andronicus Ducas, (died 14 October 1077) was a Greek protovestiarios and protoproedros of the Byzantine Empire.

Life
Andronikos Doukas was son of the Caesar John Doukas and Eirene Pegonitissa. His father was a brother of Emperor Constantine X Doukas. His maternal grandfather was Niketas Pegonites.  Andronikos himself was a first cousin of Michael VII Doukas.

In 1071 Andronikos was the commander of a section of the Byzantine army in the campaign of Romanos IV Diogenes against the Seljuk Turks of Alp Arslan.  Commanding the rearguard of the army during the Battle of Manzikert, Andronikos announced that the emperor had been cut down and deserted from the battlefield.  He was widely blamed for causing the crushing defeat of the Byzantine forces and the subsequent capture of Romanos IV by the enemy.

In 1072, after Romanos had been released by Alp Arslan, Andronikos and his brother Constantine were sent out by Michael VII and their father the Caesar John to intercept him. They defeated Romanos and hunted him down in Cilicia.  It was Andronikos who finally obtained Romanos' surrender and conducted him towards Constantinople.  In spite of his former hatred for the deposed emperor, Andronikos is said to have opposed his blinding on 29 June 1072.

In an act of 1073, he is recorded with his titles as protoproedros, protovestiarios and megas domestikos, which Michael Attaleiates clarifies as being the post of domestikos ton scholon of the East, which he had been given when sent against Diogenes.

In 1074, together with his father, Andronikos commanded the imperial army against the rebel mercenaries led by Roussel de Bailleul.  Both were captured by the rebels, who released the badly wounded Andronikos to allow him to seek proper medical treatment in Constantinople.  There he recovered for a few years, but in October 1077 died of an edema.

Family

Andronikos Doukas married Maria of Bulgaria, daughter of Troian, a son of Emperor Ivan Vladislav of Bulgaria. Maria of Bulgaria and Andronikos Doukas had seven children:
Michael Doukas
Constantine Doukas
Stephen Doukas
John Doukas
Irene Doukaina, who married Emperor Alexios I Komnenos.
Anna Doukaina, who married George Palaiologos
Theodora Doukaina, a nun

References

Sources
 
 

1077 deaths
Andronikos
Deaths from edema
11th-century Byzantine people
Domestics of the Schools
Year of birth unknown
Byzantine people of the Byzantine–Seljuk wars
Protovestiarioi